VTM or Vlaamse Televisie Maatschappij (English: Flemish Television Company) is the main commercial television station in Flanders (the Dutch-speaking northern region of Belgium) and forms part of a network of channels owned by DPG Media (formerly Medialaan).

It was launched on February 1, 1989 as the second commercial television channel in Belgium after the French-speaking RTL-TVI, and quickly became the most popular TV channel in the Flemish part of Belgium. Early programming consisted of local versions of game shows like 'Rad Van Fortuin' (Wheel of Fortune) or 'Waagstuk!' (Jeopardy!). The channel is also considered to have been instrumental in the rebirth of the local music industry as it was the first TV channel to promote local music through its primetime TV show 'Tien om te zien' (Ten to see), a weekly chart show with only local music productions.

The channel's focus on local music and local versions of international TV formats quickly allowed it to outperform public television in 1989 and the early 1990s. Average marketshare went up to over 40% in 1993. Currently VTM is still the Flemish commercial market leader and the 2nd biggest channel in Flanders. It can be received on cable, digital cable, IPTV in Flanders and Belgium and by satellite in Europe.

Parent company DPG Group also operates sister channels, including VTMKzoom (children's), as well as VTM 2 and VTM 3. Many programs originally aired on VTM may later rerun on these other channels. The broadcaster also owns two radio stations: Q-music and JOEfm. It also formerly owned the now defunct Radio BemBem. In 2005 there were talks about MEDIALAAN, VTM's former owner, buying the Flemish part of Canal Plus from Telenet but this fell through. In 2006 rumours spread that the RTL Group would buy 50% of MEDIALAAN, but VTM as well as RTL denied those plans.

In 2004, VTM lost its market dominance back to the public broadcaster VRT's flagship channel één. After its big rebrand in 2008 and the latest smaller rebrand in 2012, VTM regained strength with popular shows.

Programming

Currently aired Flemish (co-)productions
Benidorm Bastards (reruns only)
Echte Verhalen: De Buurtpolitie
Familie (Belgian soap opera)
Het Weer
I Can See Your Voice
The Masked Singer
The Voice Kids
The Voice van Vlaanderen
VTM Nieuws
Wittekerke

Currently aired Imported productions
9-1-1
America's Funniest Home Videos
Chicago Fire
Chicago Med
Chicago P.D.
Last Man Standing
Private Practice
Speechless
Sturm der Liebe
Suits
Take Two

Formerly aired Flemish (co-)productions
Aspe
Boer zkt Vrouw
Comedy Toppers
David
De Beste Hobbykok van Vlaanderen
De...dagshow
De Grote Sprong
De Juiste Prijs
De Kotmadam
De Vlaamse 10
Ella
Een ster in de familie
Gina & Chantal
Goedele Nu
Het mooiste meisje van de klas
Idool
Jambers
Jonas&VanGeel
Klasgenoten
Kriebels
LouisLouise
Make Belgium Great Again
My Name Is...
Matroesjka's
Ons geluk
Over Winnaars
Royalty
Sara
So You Think You Can Dance
Stressvakantie
The Team (European TV series)
Team Spirit
Telefacts
Telefacts 360
Telefacts Crime
Vlaamse Hollywood Vrouwen
X Factor
Zone Stad
Zoom

Formerly aired Imported productions
9-1-1
All Saints
Border Security: Australia's Front Line
Boston Legal
Chuck
Cold Case
Dawson's Creek
DC Super Hero Girls
Diff'rent Strokes
Empty Nest
ER
Frasier
Fresh Off the Boat
Galidor: Defenders of the Outer Dimension
Half & Half
House
How I Met Your Mother
Lou Grant
Love Bites
Magnum, P.I.
McLeod's Daughters
Mercy
Merlin
NYPD Blue
Packed to the Rafters
Rush
Second Noah
Shark
Shades of Blue
Sons of Tucson
The Education of Max Bickford
The Event
The Ex List
The Good Doctor
The Guardian
The Voice (U.S.)
Third Watch
Touched by an Angel
Two and a Half Men
Will & Grace
Yes, Dear

TamTam

For several years, VTM broadcast a kids' strand called TamTam, competing with VRT's Ketnet. It featured programmes such as Teletubbies Everywhere and Miffy for little children and shows such as SimsalaGrimm, Tweety and Sylvester Mysteries, Schuif Af and Kids Top 20 for older kids. During VTM's latest rebrand on 29 February 2008, the channel decided to do away with the TamTam brand. The programming block is now broadcast under the VTM brand.

VTM Kids
VTM Kids was the kids channel of VTM. It aired between 6am and 6pm. There was also a channel called VTM Kids+ which aired 24/7 and was a digital only channel. The VTM Kids brand started on 1 October 2009.

Teletext
VTM started a teletext service on 1 February 1996 which was stopped on 1 November 2014. The page 888 is still available for subtitles.

Logos

See also
List of television channels in Belgium

References

External links
VTM
VTMKZOOM
2BE
Jim
Q-music
JoeFM
MEDIALAAN
VMMtv

1989 establishments in Belgium
Television channels in Flanders
Television channels in Belgium
Television channels and stations established in 1989
Vilvoorde